Milorad Mitrović may refer to:

 Milorad Mitrović (footballer, born 1908) (1908–1993), Serbian footballer
 Milorad Mitrović (footballer, born 1949), Serbian footballer
 Milorad Mitrović (poet) (1867–1907), Serbian poet

See also 
 Milorad
 Mitrović